Aristide Caradja (28 September 1861 – 29 May 1955) was a Romanian entomologist and lawyer.

Life
Aristide Caradja was born in 1861 to the Caradja family, nobles with Greek-Byzantine origins who had serves as dignitaries in the Ottoman Empire. His father died in 1887, whereupon Aristide moved to Romania. He did most of his work there. In 1893, Caradja published his first paper, which organized and discovered several butterflies in France and in his area. Between 1927–1939, he studied and collected butterflies in the Black Sea region and in China. In 1944, he donated his work and collection (known as the Lepidoptera collection) to the Grigore Antipa National Museum of Natural History. He was elected a titular member of the Romanian Academy in 1948, soon after the communist regime came to power. He retired shortly thereafter and died in Bucharest in 1955.

References

1861 births
1955 deaths
People from Dresden
People from the Kingdom of Saxony
Caradja family
Romanian nobility
Romanian entomologists
Lepidopterists
Titular members of the Romanian Academy
Members of the Romanian Academy of Sciences